The 1946 Dayton Flyers football team was an American football team that represented the University of Dayton as an independent during the 1946 college football season. In their 21st and final season under head coach Harry Baujan, the Flyers compiled a 6–3 record.

Schedule

References

Dayton
Dayton Flyers football seasons
Dayton Flyers football